V60 or V-60 may refer to:
 LG V60 ThinQ, a phablet
 Hanlin eReader V60, an ebook reader
 NEC V60, a CISC processor manufactured by NEC introduced in the late 1980s
 Volvo V60, the estate version of the Volvo S60
 DB Class V 60, a German railways shunter
 V60 (coffee), a coffee drip brewer
 MÁV Class V60 electric locomotive of the Hungarian State Railways constructed by Kandó Kálmán in the early 1930s for the regular operation with 50 Hz industrial frequency of the line 1: Budapest–Vienna railway
 Kamov V-60, a projected light (3500kg) armed escort helicopter from Kamov based on the civil Ka-126
 Vanadium-60 (V-60 or 60V), an isotope of vanadium